Central Sports Club of the Armed Forces of Ukraine (transliteration: Tsentralnyi Sportyvnyi Klub Zbroinykh Syl Ukrayiny) or CSK ZSU is a sports club that was created on December 15, 1992 based on the Soviet Sports Club of Army (SKA Kyiv) in Kyiv (regional center of CKA), which dissolved after the fall of the Soviet Union. CSK ZSU is subordinated to the Sport Administration of Ministry of Defense (created on April 29, 1992).

The club is a member of the National Olympic Committee of Ukraine and prepares Ukrainian Olympic reserve (Olympians) for Olympic Games.

The club also used administer couple of professional teams, particularly in football such as FC CSKA Kyiv and cooperated with CSKA-Borysfen (since 2001 known as FC Arsenal Kyiv).

Brief overview

Sports Club of the Army (Soviet Union)
The predecessor of CSK ZSU was the Sports Club of the Kyiv Military District (SK KVO) which was established on April 1, 1957 by the district's administration of military training as a regional department of the Sports Society of Armed Forces of the USSR. The club was based on the Sports Club of the Kyiv Military District Officers' Club (SKDO Kyiv). The newly established club included following sports establishments:
 Palace of sports (vulytsia Leitynantska, #1/3)
 Stadium (Povitroflotske shose, #32)
 Covered swimming pool (Povitroflotske shose, #32)
 Equestrian sports facilities (vulytsia Leitynantska, #1/3)
 Shooting sports facilities (shooting range at Koncha-Zaspa)

The Palace of sports, stadium and the shooting range were all inherited from the Officers' Club. The swimming pool, initially uncovered, was part of the Officers' Club since 1951. However after its reconstruction in 1956, it was handed to the administration of military training and was transferred to the sports club only on April 1, 1958, a year later. The equestrian sports facilities were created on the base of a liquidated stables of the 114th Separate Rifle Company and were transferred to the sports club as well. In 1957 the football squad of military servicemen from the Soviet Class B (third tier) were added to the club. The football squad was completely sponsored by the Kyiv Military District headquarters. In 1959 the team however was dissolved.

On May 10, 1960, a day after the Victory Day, the club was renamed into the Sports Club of Army (SKA Kyiv). On July 4, 1962 the shooting sports facilities were transferred to the military unit #01626. Since May 20, 1971 the club was transferred to the staff of #48/105-A and on December 15 it adopted the number 14 becoming the 14th Sports Club of Army. On February 12, 1980 the club created two children and youth sports schools. One school was for fighting sports and team sports, while another - for other Olympic sports.

Central Sports Club of the Armed Forces of Ukraine (Ukraine)
With fall of the Soviet Union all Soviet organization that were funded through the central government ceased to exist. In 1992 the Kyiv Military District was dissolved, some of its components were moved to Russia, while others were transferred to the Armed Forces of Ukraine. The former SKA Kyiv was discontinued and all its assets were transferred into the newly formed the Central Sports Club which absorbed all the Soviet Army centers based in Ukraine such as Odessa, Lviv, and Sevastopol (every one corresponds to the administrative center of a Soviet military district).

Sports and Tournaments

Departments of individual sports

 

 Other (Radio sport, Avia-modeling sport)

Membership
 International Military Sports Council
 National Olympic Committee of Ukraine

Tournaments
 Olympic games delegates to the National Olympic Committee of Ukraine (NOC Ukraine)
 World Cups
 Continental Cups
 World Cup among military service personnel
 Spartakiade of allied armies (Soviet Commonwealth)

Olympic laureates

Club's Olympians

1996 Summer Olympics
 Timur Taimazov (weightlifting)
 Lieutenant Oleksandr Bahach (Bronze, athletics)
 (combined team) Volodymyr Shamenko (Bronze, gymnastics)
 (combined team) Senior Proporshchik Olena Pakholchyk (Bronze, sailing)
 Senior Proporshchik Olena Sadovnycha (Bronze, archery)

2000 Summer Olympics
 Lieutenant Olena Sadovnycha (Silver, archery)
 Lieutenant Olena Pakholchyk (Bronze, sailing)
 Praporshchik Roman Shchurenko (Bronze, athletics)

2004 Summer Olympics
 First Sergeant Hanna Kalinina (Silver, yacht)
 (team) Senior Praporshchik Oleh Lykov and Senior Praporshchik Leonid Shaposhnikov (Bronze, rowing)
 Senior Praporshchik Tetyana Semykina (Bronze, rowing)
 Praporshchik Viktoriya Styopina (Bronze, athletics)
 Senior Praporshchik Vladyslav Tretiak (Bronze, fencing)

2008 Summer Olympics
 (combined team) Halyna Pundyk and Olha Zhovnir (Gold, fencing)
 Praporshchik Iryna Lishchynska (Silver, athletics)
 Praporshchik Viktoriya Tereshchuk (Bronze, pentathlon)

2012 Summer Olympics
 (team) Nataliya Dovhodko, Junior Sergeant Anastasiya Kozhenkova, Junior Sergeant Kateryna Tarasenko, Lieutenant Yana Dementieva (Gold, rowing) 
 Junior Lieutenant Yuriy Cheban (Gold, canoeing)
 Oleksandr Pyatnytsya (Silver, athletics)
 (combined team) Mariya Ryemyen (Bronze, athletics)

2015 European Games
 Oleh Vernyayev (2 Gold, gymnastics)
 (combined team) Senior Sergeant Olha Zhovnir, Alina Komashchuk, Olena Kravatska (Gold, fencing)
 Andriy Khloptsov (Gold and Bronze, swimming)
 Senior Private Andriy Yagodka (Gold, fencing)
 (combined team) Oleh Vernyayev (Silver, gymnastics)
 Private Olena Sayko (Silver, sambo)
 Senior Private Svitlana Yaryomka (Bronze, judo)
 Vasyl Shuptar (Bronze, wrestling)

Medal tables

Medals by Summer Games

Medals by summer sport 
Updated for 2012 Olympics

Olympic centers and clubs

Centers
 Sports base for summer sports of Ministry of Defense, Lviv
 Army Sports Club Stadium (Lviv)
 "Vlasta" Hotel (before 1990 - "Rossiya")
 Sports base for winter sports "Tysovets", Skole
 Army Sports Club Stadium (Odessa) was illegally converted from a government property into private back in 1998. Criminal case on the issue is still pending.
 Kyiv Sports Complex, Kyiv
 CSK ZSU Stadium, a central venue of the club

Clubs
 Central Sports Club of the Armed Forces of Ukraine, Kyiv
 Sports club Odessa
 Sports club Bila Tserkva
 Sports club Sevastopol
 Group of athletes of the highest qualification

See also
 FC CSKA Kyiv, football club of CSK ZSU
 National Olympic Committee of Ukraine
 Armed Forces (sports society)
 Officers' Club of Armed Forces of Ukraine

External links
 Official website
 List of fitness-sports associations at the National Olympic Committee of Ukraine website
 Sports in Armed Forces of Ukraine (website of Ministry of Defense)
 Training and sports camp for summer sports in Lviv website
 Law of Ukraine on Fitness and Sports
 Red Army House (Officers' Clubs), Soviet archives
 Red Army House in Minsk
 List of Olympic centers

1992 establishments in Ukraine
Sports clubs established in 1992
Collective members of the National Olympic Committee of Ukraine
Military sports clubs